The discography of American country artist Skeeter Davis contains 32 studio albums, 18 compilation albums, 59 singles, 53 lead singles, six collaborative singles, two other charted songs and two additional appearances. Davis was first one half of the duo, The Davis Sisters before embarking on a solo career with the RCA Victor label. Her second single was 1957's "Lost to a Geisha Girl", which reached the top 15 of the American Billboard Hot Country Songs chart. It was followed in 1959 by the top five country selection, "Set Him Free". The same year, Davis's debut studio album was issued on RCA Victor titled I'll Sing You a Song and Harmonize Too. Her career momentum continued to build in 1960 with two top five back-to-back singles: "(I Can't Help You) I'm Falling Too" and "My Last Date (With You)". Both selections also climbed into the Billboard Hot 100 top 40. They were featured on Davis's second studio album called Here's the Answer. Between 1961 and 1962, Davis had top ten Billboard country singles with "Optimistic" and "Where I Ought to Be". 

In 1963, Davis reached the zenith of commercial success with the single, "The End of the World". The song reached number two on the Billboard country and pop charts. It also reached the top ten of the R&B chart and topped the adult contemporary chart. It was included on her third studio album called Skeeter Davis Sings The End of the World. It was followed by another crossover single titled "I Can't Stay Mad at You". Between 1963 and 1964, Davis reached the Billboard country top ten with "I'm Saving My Love" and "Gonna Get Along Without You Now". Between 1963 and 1964, RCA Victor released two studio LP's of her material, including Cloudy with Occasional Tears, which reached number 11 on the Billboard Top Country Albums chart. Although her singles reached progressively lower chart positions as the sixties progressed, RCA continued releasing a series of LP's of Davis's material. This included My Heart's in the Country (1966) and Why So Lonely? (1968), which reached charting Billboard country positions. 

In 1965, Davis collaborated with country artist, Bobby Bare, on the top 20 single, "A Dear John Letter". It was included on their 1965 album, Tunes for Two, which charted at number eight on the Billboard country LP's chart. In 1967, Davis returned to the country top five with the single "What Does It Take (To Keep a Man Like You Satisfied)". Davis had several more top ten and top 20 country singles on the Billboard and RPM charts (Canadian country chart): "Fuel to the Flame" (1967), "There's a Fool Born Every Minute" (1968) and "I'm a Lover (Not a Fighter)" (1969). She continued recording for RCA Victor through 1974. Among her most commercially-successful songs of this period was 1971's "Bus Fare to Kentucky" and 1973's "I Can't Believe That It's All Over". The latter was a top 20 Billboard and RPM country single. Davis then released material on several independent labels through 1989. Among them was a collaborative studio album with NRBQ in 1985 called She Sings, They Play and 1989's You Were Made for Me with Teddy Nelson.

Albums

Solo studio albums

Collaborative studio albums

Compilation albums

Singles

As lead artist

As a collaborative artist

Other charted songs

Other appearances

Notes

References 

Country music discographies
 
Discographies of American artists